The First Battle of Athenry was fought on 15 August 1249 at Athenry in modern County Galway, Ireland. The Gaelic forces of Connacht besieged the town but were repelled by the Normans under Jordan de Exeter, Sheriff of Connacht.

Áth na Ríogh had existed as a Gaelic settlement under the Ó Mainnín kings of Soghain , but between 1236 and  1241 Meyler de Bermingham captured the area and made Athenry an urban walled settlement. Though by 1249 it featured a castle and Franciscan friary, it was still close to hostile Gaelic territory.

The contemporary Annals of Connacht give the following account of the battle:

Sluagad aili la macaib rig Connacht co hAd na Rig da loscad & da lomarcain, fo fel Muri i meodon in fogmair, & dochodur sluag mor ann sin fo Toirrdelbach mac Aeda & fo Aed mac Aeda. Et do bi Serriam Connacht isin baili ara cinn & Goill imda imar aen ris, & ro iarsat Goill cardi in laesin ara uasli i nn-onoir Mure Mathar isa la do bai ann, & ni tucsat na meic rig in charde-sin amach i n-onoir Mure na na Croiche Cesta & ro insaigset in baili d' aindeoin Torrdelbaig.

Et o't-conncatar Siurtan & na Gaill sin tancatar asin bali immach i coinne na mac rig-sin. Dorone Mure mirbaili ann sin. O'tconncatar na meic rig cona muintir in marcsluag etigti armtha cucta ro gab grain & ecla iat ica facsin & ro mebad dib, & do marbad Aed mac Aeda h. Conchobair ann sin & Diarmait Ruad mac Cormaic h. Mailseclainn & da mac h. Cellaig et Brian in Doiri mac Magnusa & in Carrach Insibail mac Neill h. Conchobair & Baethgalach Mac Aedacan & Mathgamain mac Taidc meic Diarmata Bachlaig h. Conchobair & da mac Lochlainn h. Conchobair & Domnall mac Cormaic Meic Diarmata & in Findanach Mac Branan & Cu Muman Mac Casurlaig & daine imda eli.

The kings' sons of Connacht made another hosting, to burn and pillage Athenry ('co hAd na Rig'), at the feast of Mary in mid-autumn. They went thither, a great host, including Toirrdelbach son of Aed and Aed son of Aed, and the Sheriff of Connacht was there to meet them, with many Galls. The Galls asked for a truce on that day, on account of its sanctity; in honour of Mary Mother whose day it was. The princes would not grant that truce to honour Mary or the Crucifixion, but attacked the town, though Toirrdelbach was unwilling.

When Jordan and the Galls saw this they issued from the town against the princes. Mary wrought a miracle then; for when the princes and their followers saw the horsemen in arms and armour making towards them, horror and dread seized them and they were put to flight. Aed son of Aed O Conchobair was killed there, and Diarmait Ruad son of Cormac O Mailsechlainn, O Cellaig's two sons, Brian of the Wood son of Magnus, Carrach Insiubail son of Niall O Conchobair, Baethgalach Mac Aedacain, Mathgamain son of Tadc son of Diarmait Bachlach O Conchobair, Lochlainn O Conchobair's two sons, Domnall son of Cormac Mac Diarmata, Findanach Mac Branain, Cu Muman Mac Casurlaig and many others.

An almost word-for-word account is given in the contemporary Annals of Loch Cé, upon which the account in the Annals of the Four Masters, written in the 1630s, was based.

See also
 Second Battle of Athenry

References

Sources
 Martyn, Adrian, "The First Battle of Athenry", p. 10, East Galway News & Views, March/April 2008.
 Martyn, Adrian, The Tribes of Galway:1124–1642, Galway, 2016.

External links
 http://www.mannionclan.org/
 http://www.ucc.ie/celt/published/T100011/index.html

1249 in Ireland
Athenry 1249
Athenry
Athenry
Athenry
Athenry